Taiseer Jaber Al-Jassim (can also be spelled as Taisir Al-Jassim, born 25 July 1984) is a former Saudi Arabian professional footballer who played as a midfielder. He was the captain of Al-Ahli Saudi FC and a vice-captain of the Saudi Arabia national team. He retired from international football in 2018 and completely retired in 2020.

Club career

Al-Ahli
Taiseer started his career at Hajer before joining Al-Ahli on 19 June 2001. His older brother Misfer also joined Al-Ahli from Hajer before his signing. He made his debut for Al-Ahli on 18 October 2002 in the Federation Cup final against Al-Ettifaq. He made his league debut on 31 October 2002 in the 4–0 win against Al-Ettifaq. On 26 February 2005, Taiseer scored his first goal for Al-Ahli in the 3–2 derby loss against Al-Ittihad. On 8 March 2005, Taiseer made his continental debut and scored once for Al-Ahli in the 2005 AFC Champions League against Iraqi side Al-Zawraa. On 6 October 2005, Taiseer appeared in his second Federation Cup final for Al-Ahli in the 2–0 loss against Al-Hilal. On 27 December 2005, Taiseer scored his first hat-trick for Al-Ahli against Abha in the Round of 16 of the 2005–06 Saudi Crown Prince Cup. On 7 April 2006, he started the 2006 Saudi Crown Prince Cup Final which ended in a 1–0 defeat against Al-Hilal. On 9 February 2007, Taiseer appeared in his third Federation Cup in the 3–0 win Al-Ittihad. Two months later on 27 April 2007, Taiseer started and scored in the 2007 Saudi Crown Prince Cup Final against Al-Ittihad to help Al-Ahli win their fifth title. On 8 May 2007, Taiseer was loaned out to Qatari side Al-Gharafa and appeared twice and scored once in the Emir Cup, as Al-Gharafa were eliminated in the semi-finals.

On 3 December 2008, Taiseer appeared in his sixth cup final for Al-Ahli but this time in the Gulf Club Champions Cup against Saudi side Al-Nassr. Al-Ahli defeated Al-Nassr 3–0 on aggregate to win their third title. On 8 May 2009, Taiseer joined Qatar SC on loan to participate in the Emir Cup, he made two appearances and scored once as his team were eliminated in the semi-finals once again. On 9 October 2009, Taiseer signed a new four-year contract with Al-Ahli. On 24 June 2011, Taiseer helped Al-Ahli win their eleventh King Cup title after defeating Al-Ittihad 4–2 on penalties. During the 2011–12 and 2012–13 season, Taiseer played an instrumental role in leading Al-Ahli to the 2012 AFC Champions League Final and also finishing as runners-up in the 2011–12 Saudi Professional League. He also started the 2012 King Cup Final win against Al-Nassr. Following the departure of Mohammad Massad in January 2013, Taiseer was named as club captain. On 6 December 2013, Taiseer renewed his contract with Al-Ahli for another four years. On 13 February 2015, Taiseer captained Al-Ahli in the 2–1 win against Al-Hilal in the 2015 Saudi Crown Prince Cup Final. During the 2015–16 season, Taiseer captained Al-Ahli to their first league title since the 1983–84 season.

Loan to Al-Wehda
On 19 August 2018, Taiseer was loaned to fellow Pro League Al-Wehda until the end of the 2018–19 season. His loan was ended early on 26 January 2019 and Taiseer returned to Al-Ahli.

Al-Nasr
On 4 September 2019, Taiseer joined Kuwait Premier League side Al-Nasr. He became the first Saudi player since Jamal Farhan to play in the Kuwait Premier League. On 2 July 2020, Al-Nasr ended Taiseer's contract early due to the COVID-19 pandemic in Kuwait.

International career

2007 AFC Asian Cup
Taiseer represented Saudi Arabia at the 2007 AFC Asian Cup and scored two goals against Bahrain, as his team reached the final before losing to Iraq.

2009 Gulf Cup of Nations
He also participated in the 2009 Gulf Cup of Nations and reached the final against Oman. However, he was the only player to miss in the decisive penalty shoot-out after the match ended 0-0, ultimately giving Oman the trophy after a 6-5 win.

2011 AFC Asian Cup
Taiseer scored a goal for Saudi Arabia against Syria at the 2011 AFC Asian Cup, but it wasn't enough as his team lost 2-1 and exited the tournament from the group stage.

2015 AFC Asian Cup
Taiseer scored in Saudi Arabia's 2-1 win against Iraq to help them qualify for the 2015 AFC Asian Cup.

2018 World Cup
On 19 December 2017, after Saudi Arabia qualified for the 2018 FIFA World Cup, he announced his intentions to retire after the end of the tournament. He made 2 appearances in the World Cup before his tournament ended prematurely due to injury.

Style of play
Taiseer has been described as intelligent and technically gifted with excellent work ethics. Long-range shooting, dribbling and passing are his strong points. He played in almost all midfield positions, most notably as an attacking midfielder, a winger or a central midfielder.

Personal life
Taiseer's older brother Misfer was also a footballer who played for Hajer and Al-Ahli. Taiseer is married to a Lebanese woman. He belongs to the Shia minority of Saudi Arabia and helped build a Shia mosque in his hometown.

Career statistics

Club
As of 1 May 2020.

International
Statistics accurate as of match played 20 June 2018.

International goals
Scores and results list Saudi Arabia's goal tally first.

Honours

Club
Al-Ahli
Saudi Professional League: 2015–16
King Cup: 2011, 2012, 2016
Crown Prince Cup: 2001/02 ,2006–07, 2014–15
Saudi Federation Cup: 2001, 2002, 2007
Arab Club Champions Cup: 2003
Saudi Super Cup: 2016
Gulf Club Champions Cup: 2002, 2008
Friendship Football Tournament: 2001, 2002
AFC Champions League : Runner-up: 2012
Friendly tournaments
 Al Jazeera International Cup: 2013

National team
 Islamic Games Gold Medal 2005
 Singapore Asian Championship 2007

Individual
Saudi Professional League Player of the Season: 2011–12
Saudi Professional League Best Midfielder: 2011–12
Al-Ahli Player of the Year: 2011–12
Entering Centennial Club 2015
numbers and priorities

 The first player to complete 200 matches in the history of the Saudi Professional League.
 He participated with the Saudi Arabia national team in 134 international matches in an international career that lasted for 14 years.
 He participated with Al-Ahli in the Saudi Professional League more than 200 matches, and scored in the Saudi Professional League (46 goals) and assisted (44 goals).
 His contributions to goals with Al-Ahli club reached more than 100 goals, even though he is a midfielder.
 Al-Ahli's third top scorer in the AFC Champions League, scoring 9 goals.
 assisted the Saudi Arabia national team in the 2018 World Cup qualifiers with 8 goals and contributed 14 goals in total (The most).
 Al-Ahli's top scorer for Saudi Arabia national players in the AFC Champions League.
 Al-Ahli's top scorer for Saudi Arabia national players in the Saudi Professional League.

Notes

See also
 List of men's footballers with 100 or more international caps

References

1984 births
Living people
Saudi Arabian footballers
Saudi Arabia international footballers
2007 AFC Asian Cup players
2011 AFC Asian Cup players
2015 AFC Asian Cup players
Association football midfielders
Hajer FC players
Al-Ahli Saudi FC players
Al-Gharafa SC players
Qatar SC players
Al-Wehda Club (Mecca) players
Al-Nasr SC (Kuwait) players
Saudi Arabian expatriate footballers
Saudi Arabian Shia Muslims
FIFA Century Club
Saudi Professional League players
2018 FIFA World Cup players
Expatriate footballers in Qatar
Expatriate footballers in Kuwait
Saudi Arabian expatriate sportspeople in Qatar
Saudi Arabian expatriate sportspeople in Kuwait
People from Al-Hasa
Kuwait Premier League players